Syzygium aqueum is a species of brush cherry tree. Its common names include watery rose apple, water apple and bell fruit, and jambu in several Indian languages. 

The tree is cultivated for its wood and edible fruit. The fruit is a fleshy whitish-pinkish to yellowish-pinkish or red berry which is bell shaped, waxy and crisp. 

Syzygium aqueum is native to tropical Asia and Queensland. The tree requires heavy rainfalls and can survive in tropical habitats, up to 1600m from sea level.<ref name="French, Bruce R.">[French, Bruce R. 1989. Food plants of Papua New Guinea : a compendium.].</ref> In the Philippines, it is locally known as tambis and is often confused with macopa (Syzygium samarangense'').

The wood is hard and can be used to make tools. The bark of the tree is sometimes used in herbal medicines. It is grown in orchards and gardens and parks as an ornamental plant. The leaves are edible and are sometimes used to wrap food.

The fruit has a very mild and slightly sweet taste similar to apples, and a crisp watery texture like the inside of a watermelon. It is a staple of Southeast Asian fruit stands, where it is inexpensive while in season. It does not bruise easily and may be preserved for months in a household refrigerator.

References

External links

aqueum
Trees of Malesia
Trees of New Guinea
Trees of Australia
Flora of Queensland
Myrtales of Australia
Rare flora of Australia
Fruits originating in Asia
Taxa named by Nicolaas Laurens Burman